Acrocercops walsinghami is a moth of the family Gracillariidae. It is known from Yemen.

References

walsinghami
Moths of Asia
Moths described in 1907